{
  "type": "ExternalData",
  "service": "page",
  "title": "ROCEEH/Uluzzian.map"
}

The Uluzzian Culture is a transitional archaeological culture between the Middle paleolithic and the Upper Paleolithic, found in Italy and Greece.

A team led by archaeological scientist Katerina Douka has dated the Uluzzian as lasting from shortly before 45,000 to around 39,500 years before present (BP), at a similar date or slightly earlier than the Campanian Ignimbrite eruption.

Geographical extent: In Italy: Apulia (the Grotta del Cavallo and the Uluzzo cave), Basilicata, Campania, Calabria, Tuscany, and Fumane (the northernmost point). Outside of Italy, only in Argolis, Greece (the cave of Klissoura).

Discovery

Excavations by 1963 Arturo Palma di Cesnola of the Grotta del Cavallo ("Cave of the Horse") in southern Italy uncovered the first remains later called "Uluzzian". The cave is on the Salento peninsula in Apulia, overlooking the Gulf of Taranto. The only human remains were two deciduous teeth (Cavallo B and Cavallo C) from the Uluzzian deposit of Grotta del Cavallo identified as human by (Benazzi et al., 2011). These teeth, dated to 43,000–45,000 BP, are the oldest currently-known remains of modern humans in Europe.

Middle to Upper Paleolithic transition

The Uluzzian is one of several techno-complexes considered to be "transitional assemblages": Uluzzian, Châtelperronian, Szeletian, and Lincombian-Ranisian-Jerzmanowician.

Culture
The Uluzzians made and used beads from shells of marine molluscs such as scaphopods, snails (Columbella rustica, Cyclope neritea), and other species.

See also
 Bacho Kiro cave

References

Industries (archaeology)
Upper Paleolithic cultures of Europe
Peopling of Europe
Archaeology of Italy
Archaeological cultures in Italy
Upper Paleolithic Homo sapiens fossils